The Black Swan is a 1942 American swashbuckler Technicolor film directed by Henry King and starring Tyrone Power and Maureen O'Hara.  It was based on the 1932 novel of the same title by Rafael Sabatini.

Leon Shamroy won the Academy Award for Best Cinematography, Color.

This was the final film of silent film star Helene Costello.

Although the film revolves around Captain Waring (Tyrone Power) and his ship, that ship is the "Revenge". The title relates to the enemy ship "the Black Swan" belonging to Captain Leech.

Plot
After England and Spain make peace, notorious pirate Henry Morgan (Laird Cregar) decides to reform. As a reward, he is made Governor of Jamaica, with a mandate to rid the Caribbean of his former comrades, by persuasion or force if necessary. He replaces the former governor, Lord Denby (George Zucco), but is not trusted by either the lawful residents or the pirates.

Captain Jamie Waring (Tyrone Power) and his lieutenant, Tom Blue (Thomas Mitchell), reluctantly give up their "trade" out of friendship for Morgan, but others of the Pirate Brotherhood, such as Captain Billy Leech (George Sanders) and Wogan (Anthony Quinn), refuse to change.

Meanwhile, Waring takes a liking to Denby's daughter, Lady Margaret (Maureen O'Hara), who happens to be inconveniently engaged to an English gentleman, Roger Ingram (Edward Ashley). As it turns out, her fiancé is secretly providing information about ship sailings to the unrepentant pirates.

The Jamaican assembly is in an uproar about the rogue pirates, so Morgan sends Jamie to track down Leech, but he fails due to Ingram's help. The Jamaican assembly votes to impeach Morgan, and Ingram announces he and Margaret will sail to England to inform the King.

Morgan orders Jamie to capture Leech in order to get the head of the Jamaican assembly vote against him. Jamie prepares to follow Morgan's orders, but as he doesn't want Margaret to marry Ingram he goes by her house and despite her objections, gags her, takes her and sails off.

The pirate fleet with the Black Swan shows up sailing hard behind him, and Jamie's ship is captured by Leech. Jamie pretends that he has run away to join Leech and marry Margaret. Margaret reluctantly goes along with the ruse. Morgan hears of Jamie's "betrayal" and heads off to catch them.

Leech discovers the marriage between Margaret and Jamie is a sham and captures Jamie. Leach takes Jamie's ship to where the other ships are waiting and showers them with cannon fire. However, during the fight, Jamie escapes and manages to kill Leech in a duel, as Morgan storms aboard.

Morgan is inclined to hang Jamie because he abducted Margaret, but she declares that she accompanied him of her own free will. By now, they have genuinely fallen in love and they kiss. Having been ousted from the governorship, Morgan decides to return to life as a pirate.

Cast

 George Zucco as Lord Denby

Production
O'Hara recalled that it was "everything you could want in a lavish pirate picture: a magnificent ship with thundering cannons; a dashing hero battling menacing villains ... sword fights; fabulous costumes ...". She found it exhilarating working with Power, who was renowned for his "wicked sense of humor". O'Hara grew very concerned about one scene in the picture in which she is thrown overboard in her underwear by Power, and sent a warning letter home to Ireland in advance. She refused to take her wedding ring off in one scene which resulted in screen adjustments to make it look like a dinner ring.

Reception
The film was a huge hit and made a profit of $2,366,300. The review aggregator Rotten Tomatoes reported that 80% of critics have given the film a positive review based on 5 reviews, with an average rating of 7/10.

Though the film was praised by critics and is seen as one of the period's most enjoyable adventure films, The New York Times critic thought O'Hara's character lacked depth, commenting that "Maureen O'Hara is brunette and beautiful—which is all the part requires".

Awards
Leon Shamroy won an Academy Award for Best Cinematography, while Fred Sersen, Roger Heman Sr., George Leverett were nominated for Best Visual Effects and Alfred Newman was nominated for Best Original Score.

Home media
The DVD version of the film contains commentary by Maureen O'Hara with film critic Rudy Behlmer.

References

External links

 
 
 
 

1942 films
1940s historical adventure films
American historical adventure films
American swashbuckler films
Pirate films
Films directed by Henry King
20th Century Fox films
Films whose cinematographer won the Best Cinematography Academy Award
Films set in the 1670s
Films set in Jamaica
Films scored by Alfred Newman
Films with screenplays by Ben Hecht
Cultural depictions of Henry Morgan
1940s American films